Elmwood is a bus rapid transit station on the CTfastrak line, located near the intersection of New Britain Avenue (CT-529) and New Park Avenue in West Hartford, Connecticut. It opened with the line on March 28, 2015. The station consists of two side platforms serving the busway, with two center passing lanes to allow express buses to pass buses stopped at the station.

Railroad history

The New York and New England Railroad (and predecessor Hartford, Providence and Fishkill Railroad) served a station approximately at the modern location. It opened around 1850 as West Hartford and was renamed to Elmwood in 1874. It may have been served until the end of passenger service between Hartford and New Britain in 1959. Trains using the parallel Springfield Line, originally built by the Hartford and New Haven Railroad, did not stop at Elmwood.

References

External links

CTfastrak
Transport infrastructure completed in 2015
2015 establishments in Connecticut
Buildings and structures in West Hartford, Connecticut
Bus stations in Hartford County, Connecticut
Former railway stations in Connecticut
Former New York, New Haven and Hartford Railroad stations